The 2015 Iowa Hawkeyes football team represented the University of Iowa in the 2015 NCAA Division I FBS football season. The Hawkeyes, led by 17th year head coach Kirk Ferentz, were members of the West Division of the Big Ten Conference and played their home games at Kinnick Stadium. Despite modest expectations entering the season, the team finished 12–2 overall and 8–0 in Big Ten play to win the West Division. After losing a classic to Michigan State in the Big Ten Championship Game, the Hawkeyes were invited to the 2016 Rose Bowl where they were beaten by Stanford. The team established a new single-season school record for wins.

2015 commitments

Schedule

Roster

Rankings

Game summaries

#2 (FCS) Illinois State 

Sources: Box score 

Iowa was in control of this opening day game but wasn't able to pull away until well into the third quarter. The Hawkeyes had a balanced offensive attack with nearly 450 yards of total offense with Daniels getting over 100 yards on the ground.

at Iowa State 

Source: Box Score

It was an emotional week leading up to the game because former All-Big Ten Safety Tyler Sash and basketball legend Roy Marble died. The Hawkeyes honored Sash by wearing the number 9 (Sash's jersey number at Iowa) in place of the Tigerhawk on one side of their helmets.

C. J. Beathard threw three touchdown passes to lead the Hawkeyes to victory. He also added two long runs and was named co-Big Ten Offensive Player of the Week.

Pittsburgh 

Source: Box Score

The Hawkeyes never trailed in this physical matchup, and Marshall Koehn booted a 57-yard field goal as time expired to give Iowa the win. His effort was good enough to earn Big Ten Special Teams Player of the Week honors.

North Texas 

Source: Box Score

The Hawkeyes dominated from start to finish in this lopsided victory. The final result isn't even indicative of how much Iowa rolled over the Mean Green as Iowa called off the dogs in the second half but still continued to score. Jordan Canzeri rushed for 4 touchdowns to tie the Iowa single-game record.

at Wisconsin 

Source: Box Score

Following a season opening loss to #3 Alabama, the Badgers entered this game ranked #19 after three straight convincing wins (outscoring those opponents 114–3). Wisconsin kicked a field goal on the game's opening possession to take an early 3–0 lead. The Hawkeyes capitalized on two second quarter miscues to take a 10–3 advantage into the locker room. Wisconsin tacked on a field goal in the 3rd quarter, making it 10–6. Midway through the 4th quarter, the Hawkeyes recovered a costly Wisconsin fumble on a 2nd and goal play from the Iowa 1-yard line. The Badgers reached the Iowa 16 on their final possession, but a 4th down pass fell incomplete with 36 seconds remaining and the Hawkeyes ran out the clock, ending a classic defensive battle. Cornerback Desmond King collected his second two-interception game of the season and was named co-Big Ten Defensive Player of the Week and Jim Thorpe Defensive Player of the Week.

Wisconsin was 71–9 in 80 games at Camp Randall Stadium dating back to the final game of the 2003 regular season and ending with this game. Incredibly, Iowa was 4–1 in those games with Wisconsin going 70–5 against all other opponents.

After this game, Wisconsin held a 44–43–2 edge in the rivalry.

Illinois 

Source: Box Score

Senior running back Jordan Canzeri carried the ball 43 times (school record) for 256 yards (third-best in school history) and a touchdown. He also had a receiving touchdown, and earned Big Ten Offensive Player of the Week honors.

at Northwestern 

Sources: Box score

Despite entering the game very banged up, and losing RB Jordan Canzeri early in this one, Iowa dominated the Wildcats. Sophomore Akrum Wadley became the second Iowa running back to go over 200 yards in Big Ten play (in 2015). He finished with 204 yards and a school record-tying 4 rushing touchdowns, and was named Big Ten Offensive Player of the Week.

The 30-point Hawkeye victory spoiled Northwestern's Homecoming and the 20-year Reunion of the 1995 Big Ten Championship team.

Maryland 

Sources: Box score

The Hawkeyes never trailed in this game with the Terrapins. However, the game's result was still in doubt well into the fourth quarter until a pick six by eventual Jim Thorpe awardee and future NFL player Desmond King all but assured the victory for Iowa.

at Indiana 

Sources: Box score

Every time it looked like Iowa might pull away, Indiana came back to keep it close in this back-and-forth game. One of the most critical plays of the contest came on a C. J. Beathard diving touchdown with only 17 seconds remaining before halftime. The play was reviewed as it looked like he might have lost possession before crossing the goal line but it was ultimately ruled a touchdown.

Minnesota 

Sources: Box score

Minnesota returned to Kinnick Stadium for the annual Floyd of Rosedale game with a lot of momentum from last year, when they routed Iowa 51–14 in the Twin Cities. Minnesota, despite losing David Cobb to the NFL last year and going through a mid-season coaching transition, had a lot to prove as they entered the undefeated #5 Iowa's home stadium in an attempt to deliver the upset. Mitch Leidner, who had not lived up to expectations early in the season, was coming off a good run of games, and had two weeks earlier come within a 4th-down pass at the 1 to beating a hot Michigan team.

Minnesota hung on well to the Hawkeyes but were unable to stop the Iowa halfbacks. LeShun Daniels Jr. ran for nearly 200 yards, and CJ Beathard scored on a play action bootleg in the red zone, reminiscent of Iowa great Chuck Long's game-winning bootleg against Michigan State in 1985.

Iowa kept building on its lead all night, and LeShun Daniels Jr. broke through the box to run it in 51 yards in the final 3 minutes. With Minnesota down two scores, Shannon Brooks took the offense on a high-energy no-huddle drive through the air that took less than 1 minute to score. Minnesota's onside kick failed, and Iowa took the win, 40–35.

Purdue 

Sources: Box score

The Hawkeyes jumped ahead 20–0 early in the second quarter and, after Purdue closed to within 20–13, scored 20 of the game's final 27 points for the 40–20 triumph. The win on Senior Day secured Iowa's first unbeaten record at Kinnick Stadium since the 2004 season (6–0), and matched the 7–0 mark at home from the 2003 season.

Senior Jordan Lomax led the Hawkeyes with 13 tackles, broke up a pass and forced a fumble in earning Lott IMPACT Player of the Week honors.

at Nebraska 

Sources: Box score

The Hawkeyes finished their first unbeaten regular season since the 1922 season, establishing a single-season school record with 12 wins. Iowa intercepted four passes (Parker Hesse returned one for a touchdown to earn Big Ten Freshman of the Week honors), and Jordan Canzeri ran for 140 yards and two touchdowns in the victory. With wins over Iowa State, Wisconsin, Minnesota, and Nebraska, Iowa recaptured all four rivalry trophies in 2015.

vs. Michigan State (Big Ten Championship Game) 

Sources: Box score

Iowa turned the ball over twice in the first half – a fumble leading to the Spartans first points and an interception in the end zone – but led 6–3. Michigan State dominated the third quarter in time of possession and yardage, and tacked on two field goals to lead 9–6. Trailing entering the 4th quarter for the first time all season, the Hawkeyes responded in a big way with an 85-yard touchdown pass from C. J. Beathard to Tevaun Smith that gave Iowa a 13–9 lead with 14:49 remaining. After exchanging punts, Michigan State marched 82 yards in 22 plays and took 9:04 off the clock. The game-winning score came on a 1-yard touchdown run with 27 seconds left.

vs. Stanford (Rose Bowl) 

Sources: Box score

The Hawkeyes received a bid to the 2016 Rose Bowl after dropping in the College Football Playoff ranking to #5 in their loss to Michigan State, which came as a surprise to much of sports media who believed that Ohio State would jump the loser of the Big Ten Championship Game. Since the Rose Bowl traditionally gives a bid to the winner of the Big Ten and Pac-12 conferences, and due to the new College Football Playoff system where the conference champion was likely to enter the playoff, the Rose Bowl committee had announced prior to the Big Ten Championship Game that they would give a bid to the second highest-ranked Big Ten team if a Big Ten team entered the playoff, since it was clear that the winner of the Big Ten Championship Game would finish in the Top 4 ranking.

#5 Iowa was named the home team and #6 Stanford was named the away team. Sports analysts had anticipated the contest to be exciting, due mainly to the matchup between Iowa's strong run defense and Stanford running back Christian McCaffrey, the Heisman Trophy runner-up. Iowa's run defense finished the season ranked 14th, allowing only 121 yards per game and having defeated historically rushing teams like Wisconsin, Indiana, and Nebraska. Contrarily, Christian McCaffrey led the FBS in the 2015 season with 3,864 all-purpose yards, which came from punt/kick returns, runs from scrimmage, and passes out of the backfield.

Christian McCaffrey caught a short pass and turned it into a 75-yard touchdown on the first play from scrimmage. The Hawkeyes were unable to stop him, as he averaged 9.6 YPC (172 yards on 18 carries), returned a punt for a touchdown, and converted many third downs. Though he did not rush for any touchdowns from scrimmage, he proved to be the primary playmaker for Stanford, catching a third (4) of Kevin Hogan's passes. McCaffrey was such an offensive threat that Hogan was able to make large gains with the read option, including a wide-open first-quarter option TD run.

Iowa was unable to get their run game going, rushing as a team for 1.3 YPC (48 yards on 38 carries). The longest Iowa runs came from LeShun Daniels, Jr. and Akrum Wadley (14 and 12 yards, respectively), as well as a 14-yard scramble by Beathard. Iowa's inability to establish a run game closed up Iowa's potential for play-action passing, which has been Beathard's bread and butter all season. Jordan Canzeri, Iowa's power halfback, was unable to churn significant yardage, and 3rd-team halfback Akrum Wadley (who had a 200-yard game at Northwestern, when Daniels and Canzeri were both injured) split ballcarrying duties with Daniels in the second half. Iowa's halfbacks, their biggest threat all season, were overall unable to garner any significant yardage on the ground; Derek Mitchell, Jr., Iowa's 4th-team halfback, saw significant action lining up in the backfield and caught 4 passes for 41 yards, and Wadley also contributed to the pass game by catching 3 for 60.

Stanford shut Iowa out in the first half 35–0, with Stanford's 35 points the most scored in the first half of a Rose Bowl in its entire 102-year history. Stanford's 21–0 first-quarter lead was also the most first-quarter points scored by one team in Rose Bowl history. Christian McCaffrey gained a total of 368 all-purpose yards, setting another Rose Bowl record.

By the second half, Stanford's explosiveness slowed down, scoring just 10 second-half points versus their 35 first-half points. Iowa did not score until the 3rd quarter when placekicker Marshall Koehn kicked a field goal after converting on 4th down earlier in the drive; Beathard threw 2 touchdowns in the 4th quarter, with Koehn missing one of the two PATs.

Iowa had a slight advantage in time of possession, possessing the ball for almost 33 minutes, though they were simply unable to make meaning out of their possessions. Iowa also outgained Stanford through the air by a slim margin, with 239 yards to Stanford's 223.

Iowa remained a symbol of old-school Big Ten power football, with most of their completed passes thrown to tight ends and halfbacks. Matt Vandeberg caught a touchdown pass, but star wideout Tevaun Smith only recorded 2 short receptions.

Postseason Awards 
Kirk Ferentz – Big Ten Coach of the Year, Eddie Robinson Coach of the Year, Bobby Dodd Coach of the Year
Desmond King – Big Ten Defensive Back of the Year, Winner of the Jim Thorpe Award, presented to the nation's top defensive back, and Unanimous First-team All-American.

Players in the 2016 NFL Draft

References 

Iowa
Iowa Hawkeyes football seasons
Hawkeyes Hawkeyes football